In enzymology, an arginine-pyruvate transaminase is an enzyme that catalyzes the chemical reaction

L-arginine + pyruvate  5-guanidino-2-oxopentanoate + L-alanine

Thus, the two substrates of this enzyme are L-arginine and pyruvate, whereas its two products are 5-guanidino-2-oxopentanoate and L-alanine.

This enzyme belongs to the family of transferases, specifically the transaminases, which transfer nitrogenous groups.  The systematic name of this enzyme class is L-arginine:pyruvate aminotransferase. Other names in common use include arginine:pyruvate transaminase, and AruH.

References

 
 

EC 2.6.1
Enzymes of unknown structure